Tajno Podjeziorne  is a village in the administrative district of Gmina Bargłów Kościelny, within Augustów County, Podlaskie Voivodeship, in north-eastern Poland.

References

Tajno Podjeziorne